Karenpark is a suburb of Akasia in Gauteng, South Africa. It is situated to the north west of the Pretoria CBD and in the south wescorner of the mainplace Akasia.

It used to be a predominantly Afrikaans speaking suburb for many young white residents, but the demography has changed since the end of apartheid in 1994.

References

Suburbs of Pretoria